The South Florida Reception Center (SFRC) is a state prison for men located in Unincorporated Miami-Dade, Florida, Miami-Dade County, Florida, owned and operated by the Florida Department of Corrections.  

This facility has a mix of security levels, including minimum, medium, and close, and houses adult male offenders.  SFRC first opened in 1985 and has a maximum capacity of 1315 prisoners.

References

Prisons in Florida
Buildings and structures in Miami-Dade County, Florida
1985 establishments in Florida